The men's team sprint took place on 23 February 2007. Team sprint qualifying at 16:20 CET and finals at 17:20 CET. The defending world champions were Norway's Tore Ruud Hofstad and Tor Arne Hetland.

Results 
Q – Qualified for final round due to placing in heat
q – Qualified for final round due to times
PF – Placing decided by Photo finish

Semifinals 

Semifinal 1

Semifinal 2

Final

References

External links
Final results

FIS Nordic World Ski Championships 2007